Rick Fisher may refer to:

 Rick Fisher (lighting designer), American lighting designer
 Rick Fisher (basketball) (born 1948), American basketball player
 Rick Fisher (tennis) (born 1951), American tennis player